Değirmenlik Sub-district is a sub-district of Lefkoşa District, Northern Cyprus.

References 

Lefkoşa District